The Yamaha FZR400 was a  class sport bike produced by Yamaha Motor Company between 1987 and 1994. The FZR400 was updated every year up until 1994, after which production ended. 

All FZR400s were powered by naturally aspirated, carburetted, liquid-cooled 399cc four-stroke inline-four engines with four valves per cylinder and dual overhead camshafts (DOHC). These engines were all mounted transversely in perimeter type box-section aluminium 'Deltabox' frames. Although standard-fare for modern sport bikes, in 1988 this layout was quite unique. An earlier model called FZ400R was released only in Japan in 1984.

See also
Honda CBR400
Honda RVF400
Suzuki GSX-R400
Kawasaki ZXR400

FZR400
Sport bikes
Motorcycles introduced in 1987